Iyobinte Pusthakam is a 2014 Indian Malayalam-language period thriller film directed by Amal Neerad. It stars Fahadh Faasil, Lal, Jayasurya and Isha Sharvani with Jinu Joseph, Chemban Vinod Jose, Vinayakan, Padmapriya, Sreejith Ravi, T.G Ravi, Amith Chakalakkal, John Vijay, Soubin Shahir and Lena in supporting roles. Aashiq Abu makes a cameo appearance as P.J. Antony. Faasil and Neerad co-produced the film. The movie was scripted by Gopan Chithambaran with dialogues written by Syam Pushkaran.

The film is a period drama set in the mid-20th century in Munnar, Western Ghats. It follows the life of Iyob and the sibling rivalry between his sons Aloshy, Ivan and Dimitri who are named after the characters from Fyodor Dostoyevsky's The Brothers Karamazov.

Principal photography commenced in March 2014 at Vagamon in Idukki Kerala, India. Iyobinte Pusthakam was released on 7 November 2014. The film was highly critically acclaimed and was a box-office success. It received five Kerala State Film Awards and three Kerala Film Critics Association Awards.

Plot
  
The film starts with the message "The aged aren't always wise, nor do the elderly always understand justice" (Job 32:9). The story is narrated by the communist leader, and is set in 1900 in Munnar during the British Raj. Harrison is a British businessman who comes to Munnar to cultivate tea. He finds an able boy amidst his workers and names him 'Iyob'. Harrison holds Iyob close and helps him marry Annamma. Harrison's wife leaves him and returns to England; later he sees Kazhali and becomes interested in her. When Harrison finds out Kazhali's relation with Thacho, one of his servants, he orders Iyob to kill Thacho. Iyob corners Thacho and is about to kill him when Thacho jumps off the cliff and dies. Afterwards, Harrison takes Kazhali as his mistress and she becomes pregnant. During the First World War, Harrison's business is affected and he leaves for Britain but dies on the way to Cochin, not even setting sail. Knowing this, Iyob throws Kazhali out of the house, simultaneously beating her, and takes over all assets of Harrison by using the power of attorney given by Harrison.

Annamma, without her husband's knowledge, meets Kazhali, who now has a daughter, Martha, regularly talking with her, and she also takes her youngest son, Aloshy. Aloshy and Martha become good friends. However, Annamma falls ill and dies. She is greatly mourned by all, including Kazhali and her daughter, Martha; both look on the funeral from afar.

Iyob has three sons Dimitri, Ivan and Aloshy. Dimitri and Ivan are ruthless like Iyob whereas Aloshy is kind and compassionate like his mother. His two closest friends are Chemban and Martha. Chemban's parents are killed in their house by a fire set by Aloshy's family because of their illness. Aloshy leaves the house as a child after seeing his brothers rape and kill a girl who was a servant there. He runs away to Cochin and stays there. After some years Aloshy joins the Royal Navy. After the Royal Indian Navy mutiny of 1946 he returns to his father and brothers in Munnar, but is upset by the wrongdoings of his father and brothers. He reunites with both Martha and Chemban, rescuing the latter and his wife from a beating by his brothers' henchmen. Chemban and his family leave to be safe. Martha and Aloshy become close again after they escape from a rampaging elephant. They fall in love.

Iyob finds out Aloshy was dismissed from the navy because he defected and became a part of the Indian independence movement. In a fit of anger, he orders Aloshy to leave. Aloshy meets Martha and says he will come back for her. He leaves for Cochin, but on his way he is attacked by Dimitri and Ivan who try to kill him, but Aloshy survives and is found by his childhood friend Chemban. At this time Iyob's health deteriorates and his sons overpower him making pacts with Angoor Rawther, a rich Tamil merchant despite opposition by Iyob. Dimitri and Ivan find out Aloshy is alive with Martha.

One night, Ivan went to Dimitri's room for blocking him from beating his wife Rahel. In a fit of anger, Dimitri asks Ivan why has he entered his room without his permission. Then he understood that Ivan had spent nights with Rahel in his absence. Rahel then hits Dimitri on his head with a metallic flower vase. Ivan kills Dimitri with the vase after taking it from Rahel. This is witnessed by Iyob, who realises everyone has been cheating him. It is revealed that Rahel is daughter of Thacho whom Iyob killed and she is taking revenge using Ivan. She also tries to kill him by poisoning his food.

Iyob escapes from home and ends up under Aloshy's shelter. Iyob reveals that all the assets of Harrison belongs to Kazhali and he was cheating them the whole time. Aloshy is arrested by the police but is liberated by the narrator who was against Ivan and Angoor. Ivan knowing that all the assets will be lost, decides to kill Aloshy, but he despises Rahel when he come to know about her real intention. Rahel makes a deal with Angoor to kill everyone in his way including Ivan and all the assets and Rahel will be his. Iyob and Martha try to escape through the forest, but Iyob is shot down by Angoor. Aloshy finds Martha sinking into a swamp and tries to help her. Ivan and Angoor come towards them, when Angoor tries to shoot Ivan he runs out of bullets and Aloshy stabs Angoor with a ramrod and Ivan shoots Angoor's associate, when Ivan tries to kill Aloshy he is killed by Chemban and Aloshy kills Angoor. Desperate of the situation Rahel shoots herself. Afterwards, Aloshy and Martha are seen leaving Munnar.

At the end of the film the narrator is arrested by the police and he remarks that people like Aloshy would make the life of people much prosperous than it is now.

Cast

 Fahadh Faasil as Aloshy Gomber
 Lal as Iyob
 Jayasurya as Angoor Rawther
 Isha Sharvani as Martha
 Jinu Joseph as Ivan
 Chemban Vinod Jose as Dimitri
 Vinayakan as Chemban
 Padmapriya as Rahel
 John Vijay as Ganapathy Iyer
 Lena as Kazhali
 TG Ravi as The Communist Leader
 Sreejith Ravi as The Communist Leader (Younger)
 Sal Yusuf as Harrison
 Rita Mathen as Harrison's English wife
 Soubin Shahir as Narayana (Ivan's henchman) 
 Amith Chakalakkal as Nizam Rawther
 Pauly Valsan as Thresya
 Saritha Sunil as Cheeru
 Hima Shankar as Migrant
 Surjith Gopinath as Laser
 Professor Aliyar as office comrade
 Anil Murali as Mathuppilla Police
 Chethanlal as young Chemban
 Amala Paul as a Tribal Dancer (Cameo appearance)
 Reenu Mathews as Annamma (guest appearance)
 Aashiq Abu as P. J. Antony (Cameo appearance)
 Dileesh Pothan as the Tea Shop Owner (Cameo appearance)
 Shebin Benson as teen Aloshy
 Vishnu Unnikrishnan as Young Iyob
 Nebish Benson as young Aloshy

Critical reception
Iyobinte Pusthakam opened to highly positive reviews from critics. The film was praised for its cinematography, performances and background score. Padmapriya was lauded for her stunning act by many critics. 

Menaka of Bioscope rated it "Must-Watch", calling it "a well-conceived and executed story of rivalry, hatred, vengeance, love, comradeship, cunning and killing". She appreciated the performances of the actors Fahadh Faasil, Jayasurya and Chemban Vinod Jose and commended the direction and cinematography of Amal Neerad.

Soundtrack

Accolades
 2014 Kerala State Film Awards

 Best Cinematography: Amal Neerad
 Best Makeup Artist: Manoj Angamali
 Best Sound Design: Thapas Nayak
 Special Jury Mention: Yakzan Gary Pereira & Neha Nair (music direction)

 2014 Kerala Film Critics Association Awards
 Best Film: Iyobinte Pusthakam
 Best Director: Amal Neerad
 Best Cinematographer: Amal Neerad
 Best Costume Designer: Sameera Saneesh

 2016 Indian International Film Awards Utsavam
 Best Performance in a Negative Role: Jayasurya

Asianet Film Awards
 Best Film: Amal Neerad, Fahadh Faasil
 Best Character Actress(Nominated): Padmapriya

References

External links
 
 
 Iyobinte Pusthakam at M3DB

2014 films
2010s Malayalam-language films
Films set in 1900
Films set in the British Raj
Films shot in Munnar
Films with screenplays by Syam Pushkaran
Films directed by Amal Neerad
Book of Job